Desirable Daughters  (2002)  is a novel by Bharati Mukherjee.  The sequel to this novel is The Tree Bride (2004).

Publication history
 Hardcover — , published in March 2002 by Hyperion.
 Paperback — , published in March 2003 by Hyperion

External links
 Desirable Daughters - google books
Powells review
Village Voice review
Tribune India review
Desi Journal review

2002 American novels
American historical novels
Novels by Bharati Mukherjee
Novels set in San Francisco